is a private university in Toshima, Tokyo, Japan, established in 1987.

External links
  

Educational institutions established in 1987
Private universities and colleges in Japan
Universities and colleges in Tokyo
1987 establishments in Japan